The Pyrrhichios or Pyrrhike dance ("Pyrrhic dance"; Ancient Greek: πυρρίχιος or πυρρίχη, but often misspelled as πυρρίχειος or πυρήχειος) was the best known war dance of the Greeks. It was probably of Dorian origin and practiced at first solely as a training for war. According to ancient sources, it was a weapon dance.

Overview
Plato (Leges, 815a) describes it as imitating by quick movements the ways in which blows and darts are to be avoided and also the modes in which an enemy is to be attacked. It was danced to the sound of the aulos; its time was quick and light, as is also shown by the metric foot called pyrrhic.

It was described by Xenophon in his work the Anabasis. In that work he writes that the dance was performed at a festival held in Trapezus to celebrate the arrival of the troops in the city. The following is the part in which the pyrrhic dance is mentioned:

Homer refers to the Pyrrichios and describes how Achilles danced it around the burning funeral of Patroclus.

The dance was loved in all of Greece and especially by the Spartans, who considered it light war training. This belief led the Spartans to teach the dance to their children while they were still young.

Athenian youth performed the dance in the palaestra as part of training in gymnastics. The dance was also performed in the Panathenaic Games. There were three classes of competitors: men, youth, and boys.

See also
Korybantes
Pyrrichos
Serra (dance)

References

Ancient Greek dances
Greek war dances
Anabasis (Xenophon)